Serifos (also Seriphos; Seriphos: Eth. Seriphios: Serpho) is a Greek island municipality in the Aegean Sea, located in the western Cyclades, south of Kythnos and northwest of Sifnos. It is part of the Milos regional unit. It is located about  ESE of the Athenian port of Piraeus.
 
In Greek mythology, Serifos is where Danaë and her infant son Perseus washed ashore after her father Acrisius, in response to an oracle that his own grandson would kill him, set them adrift at sea in a wooden chest. When Perseus returned to Serifos with the head of the Gorgon Medusa, he turned Polydektes, the king of Serifos, and his retainers into stone as punishment for the king's attempt to marry his mother by force.

In antiquity, the island was proverbial for the alleged muteness of its frogs. During the Roman imperial period, Serifos was a place of exile. After 1204 it became a minor dependency of the Venetian dukes of the Archipelago. In the late 19th century Serifos experienced a modest economic boom from the exploitation of the island's extensive iron ore deposits. The mines closed in the 1960s, and Serifos now depends on tourism and small-scale agriculture.

Antiquities

Worked blocks of island marble built into the walls of the medieval castle crowning Chora, the hilltop main town of Serifos, show that the ancient capital was there as well. Chance finds, primarily marble funerary sculpture, are displayed in the Archaeological Collection in Chora (open Tues.-Sun.).
 
The most impressive ancient monument is the Aspros Pýrgos (Άσπρος Πύργος), a Hellenistic marble watchtower (c. 300 BC) with walls preserved to 2 m. and an interior staircase, standing on a hilltop just east of the road from Chora to Mega Livadi, near Mega Chorio. Work began in 2011 to study the fallen blocks for an eventual reconstruction.

At least four other ancient towers have been located, including the megalithic Psaros Pyrgos (Ψαρός Πύργος) or "Couch of the Cyclops" in the SW corner of the island. The so-called "Castle of the Old Lady" (Κάστρο της Γριάς) above Ganema and Koutalas preserves scant remains of a collapsed dry-stone construction in a notch below the twin rocky summits. Rough fragments of white marble and rooftile, and archaic fine-ware potsherds on the SE terraces of the hillside suggest the existence of an ancient sanctuary.

The fortified Monastery of the Taxiarchs, dedicated to the Archangels Michael and Gabriel, was built in 1572 just outside the village of Galani. The sole monk is Archimandrite Makarios, who entered the monastery as a youth in 1958 and continues to maintain it.

Churches gallery

History

Antiquity 
Serifos was colonized by Ionians from Athens, and it was one of the few islands which refused submission to Xerxes I. By subsequent writers Serifos is almost always mentioned with contempt on account of its poverty and insignificance and it was for this reason employed by the Roman emperors as a place of banishment for state criminals. It is curious that the ancient writers make no mention of the iron and copper mines of Serifos, which were, however, worked in antiquity, as is evident from existing traces, and which, one might have supposed, would have bestowed some prosperity upon the island. But though the ancient writers are silent about the mines, they are careful to relate that the frogs of Serifos differ from the rest of their fraternity by being mute.

Middle ages 
Serifos was part of the Byzantine Empire until 1204, when the island came under Venetian rule. During this time the mines reopened, after about 1000 years of inactivity. In 1394 a strike of the miners against the Nikolaos Adoldos occurred.

The miners' strike of 1916

In the  20th century, the mines of Serifos were exploited by the mining company "Société des mines de Seriphos-Spiliazeza," under the direction of German mineralogist A. Grohmann (died 1905). In the summer of 1916, in response to low pay, excessive working hours, poor safety conditions, and the company's refusal to rehire workers who had been drafted into the Greek army and recently demobilized, the 460 miners formed a union and organized a strike. Their leader was Constantinos Speras, a Serifos native educated in Egypt, who was an anarcho-syndicalist with long experience of labor struggles on the Greek mainland. In response to the strike, Grohman asked for the help of Greek authorities, who sent a 30-man gendarmerie (Χωροφυλακή) detachment from nearby Kea. After detaining Speras and the strike committee, the gendarmerie lieutenant ordered his men to fire on the workers, who had gathered at the ore loading dock at Megalo Livadi and refused to permit a cargo ship to be loaded. Four workers were killed and a dozen wounded. The workers, supported by their wives, attacked the gendarmes with stones, killing three of them and routing the others. The freed leadership took control of island institutions and sent a message placing Serifos under protection of the French fleet at Milos. This effort at collective proletarian self-organisation was cut short by the refusal of the French navy to intervene, and by the arrival of a Greek warship. Speras was arrested and charged with high treason, but released a few months later when the royalist government was ousted. Grohmann was given once again the control of the mines, after granting improved working conditions and an 8-hour workday.

Historical population

Communities
Galani
Kallitsos
Koutalas
Livadi Serifou
Mega Chorio
Mega Livadi
Panagia
Sykamia
Serifos (town) or Chora

See also
Communities of the Cyclades

Notes

References

External links

Seriphos in Googlemaps

Municipalities of the South Aegean
Mediterranean port cities and towns in Greece
Cyclades
Islands of Greece
Populated places in Milos (regional unit)
Landforms of Milos (regional unit)
Islands of the South Aegean
Members of the Delian League
Locations in Greek mythology
Populated places in the ancient Aegean islands